Trequanda is a comune (municipality) in the Province of Siena in the Italian region Tuscany, located about  southeast of Florence and about  southeast of Siena.

Trequanda borders the following municipalities: Asciano, Pienza, Rapolano Terme, San Giovanni d'Asso, Sinalunga and Torrita di Siena and consists of the following villages: Trequanda, Castelmuzio and Petroio.

The parish church, in Gothic-Romanesque style, was built from 1327, and later renovated in Renaissance style. It houses an Ascension attributed to Il Sodoma and a terracotta of "Madonna with Child" attributed to Andrea Sansovino. The high altar (15th century) is by Giovanni di Paolo.

References

Cities and towns in Tuscany